Choska is an unincorporated community in Wagoner County, Oklahoma, United States. It is located on Oklahoma State Highway 104 at the junction of E. 0810 Road and N. 4150 Road, approximately two miles northeast of Haskell and six miles west-southwest of Porter. Choska is primarily a farming community consisting of sod farms, livestock and grain production.

References

External links
 https://www.mapquest.com/us/oklahoma/choska-ok-283597392
 https://oklahoma.hometownlocator.com/maps/feature-map,ftc,1,fid,1091328,n,choska%20bottom.cfm
 https://www.okcemeteries.net/wagoner/choska/choska.htm
 https://web.archive.org/web/20120911215232/http://digital.library.okstate.edu/Chronicles/v015/v015p166.html

Unincorporated communities in Oklahoma
Unincorporated communities in Wagoner County, Oklahoma